The Singapore Armed Forces Long Service and Good Conduct (10 Years) Medal is a decoration awarded to a member of the Singapore Armed Forces (SAF) who has completed 10 years of continuous service. For NSmen, reservists qualify for the equivalent Singapore Armed Forces National Service Medal.

A clasp is awarded for an additional 5 years of service, for a total of 15 years.

Description

 The ribbon is brown, with three central white stripes.

Service medals
In the SAF, the medals for service are:
  5 years - Singapore Armed Forces Good Service Medal
 10 years - Singapore Armed Forces Long Service and Good Conduct (10 Years) Medal
 15 years - Singapore Armed Forces Long Service and Good Conduct (10 Years) Medal with 15 year clasp
 20 years - Singapore Armed Forces Long Service and Good Conduct (20 Years) Medal
 25 years - Long Service Medal (Military)
 30 years - Singapore Armed Forces Long Service and Good Conduct (20 Years) Medal with 30 year clasp

References
Singapore MINDEF Factsheet: Review of SAF medals
Singaporean Army Medals Factsheet

See also
 Singaporean orders and decorations

Military awards and decorations of Singapore
Long service medals